Pompeo Girolamo Batoni (25 January 1708 – 4 February 1787) was an Italian painter who displayed a solid technical knowledge in his portrait work and in his numerous allegorical and mythological pictures. The high number of foreign visitors travelling throughout Italy and reaching Rome during their "Grand Tour" led the artist to specialize in portraits.

Batoni won international fame largely thanks to his customers, mostly British of noble origin, whom he portrayed, often with famous Italian landscapes in the background. Such Grand Tour portraits by Batoni were in British private collections, thus ensuring the genre's popularity in Great Britain. One generation later, Sir Joshua Reynolds would take up this tradition and become the leading English portrait painter. Although Batoni was considered the best Italian painter of his time, contemporary chronicles mention his rivalry with Anton Raphael Mengs.

In addition to art-loving nobility, Batoni's subjects included the kings and queens of Poland, Portugal and Prussia, the Holy Roman Emperors Joseph II and Leopold II (a fact which earned him noble dignity), as well the popes Benedict XIV, Clement XIII and Pius VI, Elector Karl Theodor of Bavaria, and many more. He also received numerous orders for altarpieces for churches in Italy (Rome, Brescia, Lucca, Parma, etc.), as well as for mythological and allegorical subjects.

Batoni's style took inspiration and incorporated elements of classical antiquity, French Rococo, Bolognese classicism, and the work of artists such as Nicolas Poussin, Claude Lorrain, and especially Raphael. As such Pompeo Batoni is considered a precursor of Neoclassicism.

Biography

Early life
Pompeo Batoni was born in Lucca, the son of a goldsmith, Paolino Batoni and his wife, Chiara Sesti. On 5 February 1708 he was baptized in the Basilica of San Frediano. He moved to Rome in 1727, and apprenticed with Agostino Masucci, Sebastiano Conca and/or Francesco Imperiali (1679–1740).

Career
Batoni owed his first independent commission to the rains that struck Rome in April 1732. Seeking shelter from a sudden storm, Forte Gabrielli di Gubbio, count of Baccaresca took cover under the portico of the Palazzo dei Conservatori on the Capitoline Hill. Here the nobleman met the young artist who was drawing the ancient bas-reliefs and the paintings of the staircase of the palace.

Impressed by his skill and the purity of the design, Gabrielli asked Batoni to see some of his works, and when conducted to the painter's studio he was so awed by his talent that he offered him to paint a new altarpiece for the chapel of his family in San Gregorio Magno al Celio, the Madonna on a Throne with Child and four Saints and Blesseds of the Gabrielli family (1732–33), a second version of which (1736) is now at the Gallerie dell'Accademia in Venice. The Gabrielli Madonna obtained general admiration and by the early 1740s Batoni started to receive other independent commissions. His celebrated painting, The Ecstasy of Saint Catherine of Siena (1743) illustrates his academic refinement of the late-Baroque style. Another masterpiece, his Fall of Simon Magus was painted initially for the St Peter's Basilica.

Batoni became a highly-fashionable painter in Rome, particularly after his rival, the proto-neoclassicist Anton Raphael Mengs, departed for Spain in 1761. Batoni befriended Winckelmann and, like him, aimed in his painting to the restrained classicism of painters from earlier centuries, such as Raphael and Poussin, rather than to the work of the Venetian artists then in vogue. Commenting on Batoni, the art historians Boni and de Rossi said of Batoni and Mengs the other prominent painter in Rome during the second half of the 18th century, that Mengs was made painter by philosophy: Batoni by nature...(Batoni) was more painter than philosopher, (Mengs) more philosopher than painter. In 1741, he was inducted into the Accademia di San Luca.

He was greatly in demand for portraits, particularly by the British travelling through Rome, who took pleasure in commissioning standing portraits set in the milieu of antiquities, ruins, and works of art. There are records of over 200 portraits by Batoni of visiting British patrons.

Such "Grand Tour" portraits by Batoni came to proliferate in the British private collections, thus ensuring the genre's popularity in the United Kingdom, where Reynolds would become its leading practitioner. In 1760, the painter Benjamin West, while visiting Rome would complain that Italian artists "talked of nothing, looked at nothing but the works of Pompeo Batoni".

In 1769, the double portrait of the emperor Joseph II and his brother Pietro Leopoldo I (then Grand Duke of Tuscany, later emperor Leopold II), won an Austrian nobility for Batoni. He also portrayed Pope Clement XIII and Pope Pius VI.

It is believed he painted the staffage (background figures) for some of the landscape paintings of Hendrik Frans van Lint.

According to a rumour, before dying in Rome in 1787, he bequeathed his palette and brushes to Jacques-Louis David, to whom, full of admiration for his Oath of the Horatii, Batoni would have confessed: "Only the two of us can call themselves painters".

Death
His late years were affected by declining health; he died in Rome in 1787 at the age of 79, and was buried at his parish church of San Lorenzo in Lucina. Batoni's last will executors were cardinal Filippo Carandini and James Byres, the Scottish antiquary, but the estate was insolvent and his widow was forced by the events to petition the Grand Duke of Tuscany, whom Batoni had painted in 1769, for financial assistance, offering in exchange her husband's unfinished self-portrait, today at the Uffizi in Florence.

Personal life
From 1759 Batoni lived in a large house at 25, Via Bocca di Leone in Rome, which included a studio as well as exhibition rooms and a drawing academy. He was married twice, in 1729 to Caterina Setti (died 1742), and then in 1747 to Lucia Fattori, and had twelve children; three of his sons assisted in his studio. His daughters Rufina, who died on 27 April 1784 at age 27, and Maria Benedetta were accomplished singers.

Influence

Vincenzo Camuccini is said to have frequented his studio. The Italian Angelo Banchero of Sestri Ponente, Benigno Bossi of Arcisate, Paolo Girolamo Brusco of Genoa, Antonio Cavallucci of Sermoneta, Marco Cavicchia of Arpino, Adamo Chiusole, Antonio Concioli of Pergola, Domenico Conti Bazzani of Mantua, Domenico Corvi of Viterbo, Felice Giani of San Sebastiano Curone, Gregorio Giusti of Pistoia, Gaspare Landi of Piacenza, Nicola Antonio Monti of Ascoli Piceno, Giuseppe Pirovani of Pavia, Pasquale Ciaramponi of Treia, and Carlo Giuseppe Ratti of Savona, were among his students or were influenced by his work. Among the foreigners, Henry Benbridge of Philadelphia, Maria Cosway of Florence, Ivan Martos of Poltava, Johann Gottlieb Puhlmann of Zieko, and Johannes Wiedewelt of Copenhagen were among Batoni's most notable followers.

Criticism and exhibitions
Batoni was among the most celebrated Italian painters in his day, and his patrons and collectors included royals and aristocrats from all over Europe. His fame and reputation decreased over the 19th century until 20th-century scholars dedicated their critical attention to him and again revived his fame among the general public. Among them the following can be noted: the German Ernst Emmerling, the Englishmen John Steegman and Benedict Nicolson, the Italian Isa Belli Barsali, and the Americans Anthony M. Clark and Edgar Peters Bowron.

The first exhibition devoted to Pompeo Batoni was held in his hometown of Lucca in 1967, after which two other were organized in London and New York in 1982. He was again the subject of a major exhibition at the Museum of Fine Arts in Houston, the National Gallery in London, and the Ducal Palace in Lucca in 2007-08.

A portrait of George Oakley Aldrich, a fellow of Merton College, Oxford from the 1750s, identified in the Bodleian Library in Oxford by art historian Bendor Grosvenor and visual sociology researcher Emma Dabiri, is the subject of an episode of BBC Four's Britain's Lost Masterpieces first broadcast on 30 October 2019. After a full restoration by Simon Gillespie, the programme concludes with a positive attribution to Batoni made by expert in British 18th-century portraiture Prof. Robin Simon.

List of works

Allegory and History
(In chronological order)
 The Virgin Mary enthroned with saints of the Gabrielli di Gubbio family — (1732–33), San Gregorio al Celio, Rome; and (1736), Gallerie dell'Accademia, Venice
 The five allegories of the Arts — (1740) Stadelsches Kunstinstitut, Frankfurt am Main
 Apollo and Two Muses - (1741) Museum of King John III's Palace at Wilanów, Warsaw
 Catherine of Siena in Ecstasy — (1743) Museo di villa Guinigi, Lucca
 Achilles and Lycomedes — (1745) Uffizi, Florence
 Time orders Old Age to destroy Beauty — (1746) National Gallery, London
 Fall of Simon Magus — (1746–1755) St Peter's Basilica, Rome
 Aeneas escaping from Troy — (1750) Sabauda Gallery, Turin
 Vulcan - (1750) National Gallery of Canada, Ottawa
 Cleopatra shows Octavian the bust of Caesar - (1755) Musée des Beaux-Arts de Dijon
Martyrdom of Saint Lucia — (1759) Real Academia de Bellas Artes de San Fernando, Madrid
 The Holy Family — (1760) Capitoline Museum, Rome
 Diana and Cupid — (1761) Metropolitan Museum of Art, New York
 Madonna — Church of Santa Maria in Monterone, Rome

Portraits
 Portrait of Giacinta Orsini— (1758)
 Portrait of a Man in a Blue Suit — (1760s) Dallas Museum of Art
 Portrait of Richard Milles — (1760-1770) National Gallery, London
 Portrait of Humphry Morice — (1761) National Gallery, London
 Portrait of Charles Crowle — (1761–1762) Louvre, Paris
 Portrait of Lord Dundas — (1764) Aske Hall, Yorkshire, England
Portrait of Manuel de Rodas — (1765) Real Academia de Bellas Artes de San Fernando, Madrid
 Portrait of Abbondio Rezzonico — (1766) Galleria Nazionale d'Arte Antica, Rome
 Portrait of Sir Gregory Page Turner — (1768) Private Collection
 Portrait of Leopold, Grand Duke of Tuscany — (1768) Private Collection
 Portrait of Thomas Estcourt, Esquire — (1772) John Hay Library, Brown University
 Selfportrait — (1773–1774) Uffizi, Florence
 Portrait of Thomas William Coke — (1774) Holkham Hall, Norfolk, England
 Portrait of a Man (John Scott?) — (1770) National Gallery, London
 Portrait of Pius VI — (1775–1776) Sabauda Gallery, Turin
 Portrait of Douglas, 8th Duke of Hamilton — (1775–1776) Inveraray Castle
 Portrait of Francis Basset — (1778) Real Academia de Bellas Artes de San Fernando, Madrid 
Portrait of Francis Basset 1st Baron of Dunstanville — (1778) Prado Museum, Madrid
Portrait of George Legge Viscount Lewisham — (1778) Prado Museum, Madrid
Portrait of Pope Pius VI — (ca.1780) Royal Castle, Warsaw
 Portrait of Pierre André de Suffren — (c.1785)
Portrait of the Countess Maria Benedetta di San Martino — (1785) Thyssen-Bornemisza Museum, Madrid

Gallery

Portraits

Other subjects

Footnotes

References and further reading
 E. Peters Bowron and P. Kerber, Pompeo Batoni, Prince of Painters in Eighteenth-Century Rome (2008)

External links

 
 Pompeo Batoni in "A World History of Art" at all-art.org (not secure)
 Apollo and Two Muses at the Wilanów Palace Museum
 UK National Portrait Gallery Images of Frederick North, 2nd Earl of Guilford, Augustus Fitzroy, 3rd Duke of Grafton,  and Philip Metcalfe.
 Europe in the age of enlightenment and revolution, a catalog from The Metropolitan Museum of Art Libraries (fully available online as PDF), which contains material on Batoni (see index)
 
 

1708 births
1787 deaths
18th-century Italian painters
Italian male painters
Painters from Lucca
Italian neoclassical painters
18th-century Italian male artists